Herr may refer to:

 Herr (honorific), a German honorific
 Herr (surname)
 Herr (title), a German title
 Herr, Indiana, an unincorporated town in Perry Township, Boone County, Indiana, US
 Herr's Snacks, a Pennsylvania-based snack food and potato chip maker